The 1871 Hereford by-election was held on 28 February 1871. It was caused by the resignation of the incumbent MP of the Liberal Party, Edward Henry Clive.  It was won by the Conservative candidate George Arbuthnot.

References

1871 in England
Politics of Hereford
1871 elections in the United Kingdom
By-elections to the Parliament of the United Kingdom in Herefordshire constituencies
19th century in Herefordshire